In mathematics and in computer programming, a variadic function is a function of indefinite arity, i.e., one which accepts a variable number of arguments. Support for variadic functions differs widely among programming languages.

The term variadic is a neologism, dating back to 1936–1937.  The term was not widely used until the 1970s.

Overview
There are many mathematical and logical operations that come across naturally as variadic functions. For instance, the summing of numbers or the concatenation of strings or other sequences are operations that can be thought of as applicable to any number of operands (even though formally in these cases the associative property is applied).

Another operation that has been implemented as a variadic function in many languages is output formatting. The C function  and the Common Lisp function  are two such examples. Both take one argument that specifies the formatting of the output, and any number of arguments that provide the values to be formatted.

Variadic functions can expose type-safety problems in some languages. For instance, C's , if used incautiously, can give rise to a class of security holes known as format string attacks. The attack is possible because the language support for variadic functions is not type-safe: it permits the function to attempt to pop more arguments off the stack than were placed there, corrupting the stack and leading to unexpected behavior. As a consequence of this, the CERT Coordination Center considers variadic functions in C to be a high-severity security risk.

In functional languages variadics can be considered complementary to the apply function, which takes a function and a list/sequence/array as arguments, and calls the function with the arguments supplied in that list, thus passing a variable number of arguments to the function.

A related subject in term rewriting research is called hedges, or hedge variables. Unlike variadics, which are functions with arguments, hedges are sequences of arguments themselves. They also can have constraints ('take no more than 4 arguments', for example) to the point where they are not variable-length (such as 'take exactly 4 arguments') - thus calling them variadics can be misleading. However they are referring to the same phenomenon, and sometimes the phrasing is mixed, resulting in names such as variadic variable (synonymous to hedge). Note the double meaning of the word variable and the difference between arguments and variables in functional programming and term rewriting. For example, a term (function) can have three variables, one of them a hedge, thus allowing the term to take three or more arguments (or two or more if the hedge is allowed to be empty).

Examples

In C
To portably implement variadic functions in the C programming language, the standard  header file is used. In C++, the header file  is used.

#include <stdarg.h>
#include <stdio.h>

double average(int count, ...) {
    va_list ap;
    int j;
    double sum = 0;

    va_start(ap, count); /* Before C23: Requires the last fixed parameter (to get the address) */
    for (j = 0; j < count; j++) {
        sum += va_arg(ap, int); /* Increments ap to the next argument. */
    }
    va_end(ap);

    return sum / count;
}

int main(int argc, char const *argv[]) {
    printf("%f\n", average(3, 1, 2, 3));
    return 0;
}

This will compute the average of an arbitrary number of arguments. Note that the function does not know the number of arguments or their types. The above function expects that the types will be , and that the number of arguments is passed in the first argument (this is a frequent usage but by no means enforced by the language or compiler). In some other cases, for example printf, the number and types of arguments are figured out from a format string. In both cases, this depends on the programmer to supply the correct information. (Alternatively, a sentinel value like  may be used to indicate the number.) If fewer arguments are passed in than the function believes, or the types of arguments are incorrect, this could cause it to read into invalid areas of memory and can lead to vulnerabilities like the format string attack.

When working with variable arguments, a function normally declares a variable of type  ( in the example) that will be manipulated by the macros.

  takes two arguments, a  object and a reference to the function's last parameter (the one before the ellipsis; the macro uses this to get its bearings). In C23, the second argument will no longer be required and variadic functions will no longer need a named parameter before the ellipsis. The compiler will normally issue a warning if the reference is incorrect (e.g. a reference to a different parameter than the last one, or a reference to a wholly different object), but will not prevent compilation from completing normally.
  takes two arguments, a  object (previously initialised) and a type descriptor. It expands to the next variable argument, and has the specified type. Successive invocations of  allow processing each of the variable arguments in turn. Unspecified behavior occurs if the type is incorrect or there is no next variable argument.
  takes one argument, a  object. It serves to clean up. If one wanted to, for instance, scan the variable arguments more than once, the programmer would re-initialise your  object by invoking  and then  again on it.
  takes two arguments, both of them  objects. It clones the second (which must have been initialised) into the first. Going back to the "scan the variable arguments more than once" example, this could be achieved by invoking  on a first , then using  to clone it into a second .

In C#
C# describes variadic functions using the  keyword. A type must be provided for the arguments, although  can be used as a catch-all. At the calling site, you can either list the arguments one by one, or hand over a pre-existing array having the required element type. Using the variadic form is Syntactic sugar for the latter.

using System;

class Program
{
    static int Foo(int a, int b, params int[] args)
    {
        // Return the sum of the integers in args, ignoring a and b.
        int sum = 0;
        foreach (int i in args)
            sum += i;
        return sum;
    }
        
    static void Main(string[] args)
    {
        Console.WriteLine(Foo(1, 2));  // 0
        Console.WriteLine(Foo(1, 2, 3, 10, 20));  // 33
        int[] manyValues = new int[] { 13, 14, 15 };
        Console.WriteLine(Foo(1, 2, manyValues));  // 42
    }
}

In C++
The basic variadic facility in C++ is largely identical to that in C. The only difference is in the syntax, where the comma before the ellipsis can be omitted. C++ allows variadic functions without named parameters but provides no way to access those arguments since va_start requires the name of the last fixed argument of the function. 

#include <iostream>
#include <cstdarg>

void simple_printf(const char* fmt...)      // C-style "const char* fmt, ..." is also valid
{
    va_list args;
    va_start(args, fmt);
 
    while (*fmt != '\0') {
        if (*fmt == 'd') {
            int i = va_arg(args, int);
            std::cout << i << '\n';
        } else if (*fmt == 'c') {
            // note automatic conversion to integral type
            int c = va_arg(args, int);
            std::cout << static_cast<char>(c) << '\n';
        } else if (*fmt == 'f') {
            double d = va_arg(args, double);
            std::cout << d << '\n';
        }
        ++fmt;
    }
 
    va_end(args);
}

int main()
{
    simple_printf("dcff", 3, 'a', 1.999, 42.5); 
}

Variadic templates (parameter pack) can also be used in C++ with language built-in fold expressions.

#include <iostream>

template <typename... Ts>
void foo_print(Ts... args) 
{
    ((std::cout << args << ' '), ...);
}

int main()
{
    std::cout << std::boolalpha;
    foo_print(1, 3.14f); // 1 3.14
    foo_print("Foo", 'b', true, nullptr); // Foo b true nullptr
}

The CERT Coding Standards for C++ strongly prefers the use of variadic templates (parameter pack) in C++ over the C-style variadic function due to a lower risk of misuse.

In Go
Variadic functions in Go can be called with any number of trailing arguments.  is a common variadic function; it uses an empty interface as a catch-all type.

package main

import "fmt"

// This variadic function takes an arbitrary number of ints as arguments.
func sum(nums ...int) {
	fmt.Print("The sum of ", nums) // Also a variadic function.
	total := 0
	for _, num := range nums {
		total += num
	}
	fmt.Println(" is", total) // Also a variadic function.
}

func main() {
	// Variadic functions can be called in the usual way with individual
	// arguments.
	sum(1, 2)  // "The sum of [1 2] is 3"
	sum(1, 2, 3) // "The sum of [1 2 3] is 6"

	// If you already have multiple args in a slice, apply them to a variadic
	// function using func(slice...) like this.
	nums := []int{1, 2, 3, 4}
	sum(nums...) // "The sum of [1 2 3 4] is 10"
}

Output:

The sum of [1 2] is 3 
The sum of [1 2 3] is 6 
The sum of [1 2 3 4] is 10

In Java
As with C#, the  type in Java is available as a catch-all.
public class Program {
    // Variadic methods store any additional arguments they receive in an array.
    // Consequentially, `printArgs` is actually a method with one parameter: a
    // variable-length array of `String`s.
    private static void printArgs(String... strings) {
        for (String string : strings) {
            System.out.println(string);
        }
    }

    public static void main(String[] args) {
        printArgs("hello");          // short for printArgs(["hello"])
        printArgs("hello", "world"); // short for printArgs(["hello", "world"])
    }
}

In JavaScript 
JavaScript does not care about types of variadic arguments.

function sum(...numbers) {
    return numbers.reduce((a, b) => a + b, 0);
}

console.log(sum(1, 2, 3)); // 6
console.log(sum(3, 2));    // 5
console.log(sum());        // 0

It's also possible to create a variadic function using the arguments object, although it is only usable with functions created with the  keyword.

function sum() {
    return Array.prototype.reduce.call(arguments, (a, b) => a + b, 0);
}

console.log(sum(1, 2, 3)); // 6
console.log(sum(3, 2));    // 5
console.log(sum());        // 0

In Lua 
Lua functions may pass varargs to other functions the same way as other values using the  keyword. tables can be passed into variadic functions by using, in Lua version 5.2 or higher , or Lua 5.1 or lower . Varargs can be used as a table by constructing a table with the vararg as a value.function sum(...) --... designates varargs
   local sum=0
   for _,v in pairs({...}) do --creating a table with a varargs is the same as creating one with standard values
      sum=sum+v
   end
   return sum
end

values={1,2,3,4}
sum(5,table.unpack(values)) --returns 15. table.unpack should go after any other arguments, otherwise not all values will be passed into the function.

function add5(...)
  return ...+5 --this is incorrect usage of varargs, and will only return the first value provided
end

entries={}
function process_entries()
   local processed={}
   for i,v in pairs(entries) do
      processed[i]=v --placeholder processing code
   end
   return table.unpack(processed) --returns all entries in a way that can be used as a vararg
end

print(process_entries()) --the print function takes all varargs and writes them to stdout separated by newlines

In Pascal

Pascal has four built-in procedures which are defined as variadic, which, because of this special condition, are intrinsic to the compiler. However, there are alternate specifications allowing for default arguments to procedures or functions which make them work variadically, as well as polymorphism which allows a procedure or function to have different parameters.

The  and  procedures all have the same format:

read[ln] [( [file ,] variable [, variable ...] )] ;
write[ln] [( [file][, value [, value ...] )] ;

where

  is a scalar such as a char (character), integer, or real (or for some compilers, certain record types or array types such as strings); and
  is a variable or a constant.

Example:

var 
   f: text;
   ch: char;
   n,a,I,B: Integer;
   S: String;

begin
    Write('Enter name of file to write results: ');
    readln(s);    
    assign(f,S);
    rewrite(f);
    Write('What is your name? ');
    readln(Input,S);        
    Write('Hello, ',S,'! Enter the number of calculations you want to do:');
    writeln(output);
    Write('? ');
    readln(N);
    Write('For each of the ',n,' formulas, enter ');
    write('two integers separated by one or more spaces');
    writeln;
    for i := 1 to N do
    begin   
       Write('Enter pair #',i,'? ');
       read(a,b);
       READLN;
       WRITELN(Out,'A [',a,'] + B [',B,'] =',A+B);
    end;
    close(OUT);
end.

Line 26 shows the  statement can have any number of arguments, and they can be a quoted string, a variable, or even a formula result.

Object Pascal supports polymorphic procedures and functions, where different procedure(s) or function(s) can have the same name but are distinguished by the arguments supplied to them.

Pascal also supports default arguments, where the value of an argument, if not provided, is given a default value.  

For the first example, polymorphism, consider the following:

function add(a1,a2:integer):Integer; begin add := a1+a2 end;                                
function add(r1,r2:real):real;  begin add := a1+a2 end;                                 
function add(a1:integer;r2:real):real;  begin add := real(a1)+a2 end;                                
function add(r1:real,a2:integer):real;  begin add := a1+real(a2) end;                                

In the above example, if  as called with two integer values, the function declared on line 1 would be called; if one of the arguments is an integer and one is real, either the function on line 3 or 4 is called depending on which is integer. If both are real, the function on line 2 is called.

For default parameters, consider the following:

const
   Three = 3;
var 
   K: Integer; 

function add(i1: integer = 0; 
             i2: integer = 0;
             i3: integer = 0; 
             i4: integer = 0; 
             i5: integer = 0; 
             i6: integer = 0;  
             i7: integer = 0;  
             i8: integer = 0): integer;
begin
   add := i1+i2+i3+I4+I5+i6+I7+I8;
end;

begin
   K := add; { K is 0}
   K := add(K,1); { K is 1}
   K := add(1,2); { K is 3}
   K := add(1,2,Three); { K is 6, etc.}
end.

On Line 6, (and the lines below) the parameter  tells the compiler, "if no argument is provided, presume the argument to be zero". On line 19, no arguments were given, so the function returns . On line 20, either a number or a variable can be supplied for any argument, and as shown on line 22, a constant.

In PHP
PHP does not care about types of variadic arguments unless the argument is typed. 

function sum(...$nums): int
{
    return array_sum($nums);
}

echo sum(1, 2, 3); // 6

And typed variadic arguments:

function sum(int ...$nums): int
{
    return array_sum($nums);
}

echo sum(1, 'a', 3); // TypeError: Argument 2 passed to sum() must be of the type int (since PHP 7.3)

In Python
Python does not care about types of variadic arguments.

def foo(a, b, *args):
    print(args)  # args is a tuple (immutable sequence).

foo(1, 2) #
foo(1, 2, 3) # (3,)
foo(1, 2, 3, "hello") # (3, "hello")

Keyword arguments can be stored in a dictionary, e.g. .

In Raku
In Raku, the type of parameters that create variadic functions are known as slurpy array parameters and they're classified into three groups:

Flattened slurpy
These parameters are declared with a single asterisk (*) and they flatten arguments by dissolving one or more layers of elements that can be iterated over (i.e, Iterables).

sub foo($a, $b, *@args) {
    say @args.perl;
}

foo(1, 2)                  # []
foo(1, 2, 3)               # [3]
foo(1, 2, 3, "hello")      # [3 "hello"]
foo(1, 2, 3, [4, 5], [6]); # [3, 4, 5, 6]

Unflattened slurpy
These parameters are declared with two asterisks and they do not flatten any iterable arguments within the list, but keep the arguments more or less as-is:

sub bar($a, $b, **@args) {
    say @args.perl;
}

bar(1, 2);                 # []
bar(1, 2, 3);              # [3]
bar(1, 2, 3, "hello");     # [3 "hello"]
bar(1, 2, 3, [4, 5], [6]); # [3, [4, 5], [6]]

Contextual slurpy
These parameters are declared with a plus (+) sign and they apply the "single argument rule", which decides how to handle the slurpy argument based upon context. Simply put, if only a single argument is passed and that argument is iterable, that argument is used to fill the slurpy parameter array. In any other case, +@ works like **@ (i.e., unflattened slurpy).

sub zaz($a, $b, +@args) {
    say @args.perl;
}

zaz(1, 2);                 # []
zaz(1, 2, 3);              # [3]
zaz(1, 2, 3, "hello");     # [3 "hello"]
zaz(1, 2, [4, 5]);         # [4, 5], single argument fills up array
zaz(1, 2, 3, [4, 5]);      # [3, [4, 5]], behaving as **@
zaz(1, 2, 3, [4, 5], [6]); # [3, [4, 5], [6]], behaving as **@

In Ruby
Ruby does not care about types of variadic arguments.

def foo(*args)
  print args
end

foo(1)
# prints `[1]=> nil`

foo(1, 2)
# prints `[1, 2]=> nil`

In Rust 
Rust does not support variadic arguments in functions. Instead, it uses macros.

macro_rules! calculate {
    // The pattern for a single `eval`
    (eval $e:expr) => {{
        {
            let val: usize = $e; // Force types to be integers
            println!("{} = {}", stringify!{$e}, val);
        }
    }};

    // Decompose multiple `eval`s recursively
    (eval $e:expr, $(eval $es:expr),+) => {{
        calculate! { eval $e }
        calculate! { $(eval $es),+ }
    }};
}

fn main() {
    calculate! { // Look ma! Variadic `calculate!`!
        eval 1 + 2,
        eval 3 + 4,
        eval (2 * 3) + 1
    }
}

Rust is able to interact with C's variadic system via a  feature switch. As with other C interfaces, the system is considered  to Rust.

In Scala 
object Program {
  // Variadic methods store any additional arguments they receive in an array.
  // Consequentially, `printArgs` is actually a method with one parameter: a
  // variable-length array of `String`s.
  private def printArgs(strings: String*): Unit = {
    strings.foreach(println)
  }

  def main(args: Array[String]): Unit = {
    printArgs("hello");          // short for printArgs(["hello"])
    printArgs("hello", "world"); // short for printArgs(["hello", "world"])
  }
}

In Swift
Swift cares about the type of variadic arguments, but the catch-all  type is available.

func greet(timeOfTheDay: String, names: String...) {
    // here, names is [String]
    
    print("Looks like we have \(names.count) people")
    
    for name in names {
        print("Hello \(name), good \(timeOfTheDay)")
    }
}

greet(timeOfTheDay: "morning", names: "Joseph", "Clara", "William", "Maria")

// Output:
// Looks like we have 4 people
// Hello Joseph, good morning
// Hello Clara, good morning
// Hello William, good morning
// Hello Maria, good morning

In Tcl
A Tcl procedure or lambda is variadic when its last argument is : this will contain a list (possibly empty) of all the remaining arguments. This pattern is common in many other procedure-like methods.

proc greet {timeOfTheDay args} {
    puts "Looks like we have [llength $args] people"

    foreach name $args {
        puts "Hello $name, good $timeOfTheDay"
    }
}

greet "morning" "Joseph" "Clara" "William" "Maria"

# Output:
# Looks like we have 4 people
# Hello Joseph, good morning
# Hello Clara, good morning
# Hello William, good morning
# Hello Maria, good morning

See also
Varargs in Java programming language
Variadic macro (C programming language)
Variadic template

Notes

References

External links
 Variadic function. Rosetta Code task showing the implementation of variadic functions in over fifty programming languages.
 Variable Argument Functions —  A tutorial on Variable Argument Functions for C++
 GNU libc manual

Subroutines
Articles with example Python (programming language) code